Stevan Mojsilović (Serbian Cyrillic: Стеван Мојсиловић; born 5 December 1966) is a Serbian football manager and former player.

Career

Playing career
After being promoted from the Radnički Kovin youth academy at the age of 17, Mojsilović played for the senior squad from 1983 to 1991.

Coaching career
Mojsilović began his coaching career early. He started off as Radnički Kovin head coach in 1993 and remained in that position until 1995 when he became the Dinamo Pančevo youth academy director and led it from 1995 to 1996. He was then assistant coach of Obilić from 1996 to 1998 where he was assistant coach to Dragoslav Šekularac. He was assistant coach of Red Star Belgrade in the 2002–03 season. From 2004 to 2005 he was with Mladi Radnik in Požarevac and in 2006 he again collaborated with Šekularac, this time as assistant coach of the Serbian White Eagles of the Canadian Soccer League. He left the team prior to the end of the 2006 season.

In September 2014, he became the director of football of Spartak Subotica before becoming the head coach in 2015.

Honours
In 2009, Mojsilović was voted the best manager in Montenegro.

References

External links

 
 
 

1966 births
Living people
People from Kovin
Serbian people of Montenegrin descent
Association footballers not categorized by position
Serbian footballers
FK Jagodina managers
FK Obilić managers
FK Rad managers
Malavan F.C. managers
FK Spartak Subotica managers
FK Novi Pazar managers
NK Domžale managers
Red Star Belgrade non-playing staff
Serbian expatriate football managers
Serbian expatriate sportspeople in Canada
Serbian expatriate sportspeople in Iran
Serbian expatriate sportspeople in Montenegro
Serbian expatriate sportspeople in Slovenia
Serbian football managers
Serbian SuperLiga managers
Expatriate football managers in Iran
Expatriate football managers in Montenegro
Expatriate football managers in Slovenia
Expatriate soccer managers in Canada
Serbian White Eagles FC non-playing staff